Mroczek is a Polish surname. Notable people with the surname include:

 Czesław Mroczek (born 1964), Polish politician
 Marcin Mroczek (born 1982), Polish actor and dancer

Polish-language surnames